Fire Station No. 11, and variations, may refer to:
 Fire Station No. 11 (Birmingham, Alabama), listed on the National Register of Historic Places (NRHP)
Fire Station No. 11 (Denver, Colorado), a Denver Landmark
 Fire Station No. 11 (Atlanta, Georgia), NRHP-listed
Number 4 Hook and Ladder Company, Dallas, NRHP-listed, also known as "Fire Station No. 11"
Engine House No. 11 (Tacoma, Washington), NRHP-listed, also known as "Fire Station No. 11"
Truck Company F, Washington D.C., also known as "Old Engine Company 11", NRHP-listed

See also
List of fire stations